Teh Kew San (郑求山)  (born 26 January 1935) is a former Malaysian badminton player who won national and international titles from the late 1950s to the mid-1960s.

Career 
An "all-rounder" (player competitive in all three events: singles, doubles, and mixed doubles), his greatest successes came in men's doubles with Lim Say Hup. They won a number of major international tournaments on three continents, most notably the prestigious All-England title in 1959. Kew San's singles titles included the Mexico City International in 1960 and the Asian Championship in 1962. Known for his agility and deft racket work, he was a member of four consecutive Malayan/Malaysian Thomas Cup teams (1958, 1961, 1964, 1967), captaining the last which captured the world team title.

Personal life 
Teh married his national mixed doubles partner, Ng Mei Ling and they have two children, a son (Thomas) and a daughter (Karen).

Achievements

Asian Games 

Men's singles

Mixed doubles

Asian Championships 
Men's singles

Men's doubles

Southeast Asian Peninsular Games 
Men's singles

International tournaments 
Men's singles

Men's doubles

Mixed doubles

Invitational Tournaments 
Men's singles

Men's doubles

Honours 
  :
 Member of the Order of the Defender of the Realm (A.M.N.) (1968)

References 

Malaysian male badminton players
1934 births
Living people
Malaysian sportspeople of Chinese descent
Asian Games medalists in badminton
Asian Games gold medalists for Malaysia
Asian Games silver medalists for Malaysia
Asian Games bronze medalists for Malaysia
Badminton players at the 1966 Asian Games
Badminton players at the 1962 Asian Games
Southeast Asian Games medalists in badminton
Southeast Asian Games silver medalists for Malaysia
Medalists at the 1962 Asian Games
Medalists at the 1966 Asian Games
Competitors at the 1961 Southeast Asian Peninsular Games
20th-century Malaysian people